Dan Evans was the defending champion, but decided not to participate this year.

Denis Shapovalov won the title, defeating Ruben Bemelmans 6–3, 6–2 in the final.

Seeds

Draw

Finals

Top half

Bottom half

References
Main Draw
Qualifying Draw

Challenger Banque Nationale de Drummondville
Challenger de Drummondville